Paul Frederick Brissenden (September 21, 1885 – November 29, 1974) was an American labor historian, who wrote on various labor issues in the first half of the 20th century. He is perhaps best known for his 1919 work on the Industrial Workers of the World, entitled The IWW: a Study of American Syndicalism.

Biography 
Brissenden was born in Benzonia, Michigan, to parents James T. Brissenden and Retta Odell Lewis, both of whom were born in Ohio. His father worked as a farmer. He had two younger brothers, Louis and Richard, and a younger sister, Elizabeth. He earned his Master of Arts at the University of California in 1912, and completed his doctorate in political science at Columbia University in 1917 under supervision of Henry Rogers Seager.

In 1914, Brissenden worked for the U.S. Commission on Industrial Relations. From 1915 to 1920, he worked for the U.S. Bureau of Labor Statistics. He also held position of professor of economics at Columbia University and New York University.

Brissenden was married to wife Margaret Geer, and was a father of three sons, Donald, Arik, and Hoke. He died on November 29, 1974 in San Diego, California.

Work 
One of his main works was The IWW: a Study of American Syndicalism, published in 1919, a seminal work on the IWW.

In 1920, he documented labor disputes between miners in Butte and the Anaconda Copper Mining Company.

In 1923 he wrote Justice and the IWW in 1923, in which he criticized the prosecution of I.W.W. members and defended the actions of the IWW members who were imprisoned. He pointed out the prosecutions failure to actually identify the 15,000 alleged deserters, challenged the legality of the evidence seized in raids based on void warrants, and argued that prosecutors lacked sufficient evidence that IWW members had directly obstructed the war, but convicted them on the basis of their association with the IWW. He concludes that members are being imprisoned just for opposing the war.

Selected publications  
 1913, The launching of the Industrial workers of the world. 
 1918, Employment system of the Lake Carriers' Association.
 1919, The IWW: a Study of American Syndicalism.
 1919, Employment policies and labor mobility in a California sugar refinery
 1919, Labor policies and labor turnover in the California oil-refining industry
 1920. Causes of labor turnover, co-authored with Emil Frankel.
 1922, Labor Turnover in Industry, a statistical analysis co-authored with Emil Frankel.
 1923. Justice and the IWW 
 1923. Changes in the purchasing power of manufacturing labor incomes in the United States.
 1929, Earnings of factory workers, 1899 to 1927.
 1920. Labor turnover and the federal service.
 1930, The use of the labor injunction in the New York needle trades.
 1933, Campaign against the labor injunction.
 1936, Report of the special commission on wage differentials in the cap and cloth hat industry.
 1937, The economic condition of the millinery manufacturing industry in the New York Metropolitan Area, 1935-1936.
 1939, Progress and poverty in millinery manufacturing.
 1948, Union-management co-operation in millinery manufacturing in the New York metropolitan area.
 1951, Public policy in collective bargaining.
 1965, The labor injunction in Hawaii. 
 1965. Settlement of disputes over grievances in the United States : with marginal references to Australia and New Zealand, 
 1965. The challenge of industrial relations in the Pacific-Asian countries, co-edited
 1966, The settlement of labor disputes on rights in Australia.

References

External links 
 

1885 births
1974 deaths
20th-century American historians
20th-century American male writers
Labor historians
Columbia Graduate School of Arts and Sciences alumni
Historians of the Industrial Workers of the World
University of California alumni
People from Benzie County, Michigan
Historians from Michigan
American male non-fiction writers